In mathematics, the Peano–Jordan measure (also known as the Jordan content) is an extension of the notion of size (length, area, volume) to shapes more complicated than,  for example, a triangle, disk, or parallelepiped.

It turns out that for a set to have Jordan measure it should be well-behaved in a certain restrictive sense. For this reason, it is now more common to work with the Lebesgue measure, which is an extension of the Jordan measure to a larger class of sets. Historically speaking, the Jordan measure came first, towards the end of the nineteenth century.  For historical reasons, the term Jordan measure is now well-established for this set function, despite the fact that it is not a true measure in its modern definition, since Jordan-measurable sets do not form a σ-algebra. For example, singleton sets in  each have a Jordan measure of 0, while , a countable union of them, is not Jordan-measurable.  For this reason, some authors prefer to use the term .  

The Peano–Jordan measure is named after its originators, the French mathematician Camille Jordan, and the Italian mathematician Giuseppe Peano.

Jordan measure of "simple sets"

Consider Euclidean space  Jordan measure is first defined on Cartesian products of bounded half-open intervals 

that are closed at the left and open at the right with all endpoints  and  finite real numbers (half-open intervals is a technical choice; as we see below, one can use closed or open intervals if preferred). The  of such a rectangle is defined to be the product of the lengths of the intervals:

Next, one considers , sometimes called , which are finite unions of rectangles,

for any 

Luckily, any such simple set  can be rewritten as a union of another finite family of rectangles, rectangles which this time are mutually disjoint, and then one defines the Jordan measure  as the sum of measures of the disjoint rectangles.

It is in the "rewriting" step that the assumption of rectangles being made of half-open intervals is used.

Extension to more complicated sets

Notice that a set which is a product of closed intervals,

is not a simple set, and neither is a ball. Thus, so far the set of Jordan measurable sets is still very limited. The key step is then defining a bounded set to be  if it is "well-approximated" by simple sets, exactly in the same way as a function is Riemann integrable if it is well-approximated by piecewise-constant functions.

Formally, for a bounded set  define its  as 

and its  as 

where the infimum and supremum are taken over simple sets  The set  is said to be a  if the inner measure of  equals the outer measure. The  is the set function that sends Jordan measurable sets to their Jordan measure.

It turns out that all rectangles (open or closed), as well as all balls, simplexes, etc., are Jordan measurable. Also, if one considers two continuous functions, the set of points between the graphs of those functions is Jordan measurable as long as that set is bounded and the common domain of the two functions is Jordan measurable. Any finite union and intersection of Jordan measurable sets is Jordan measurable, as well as the set difference of any two Jordan measurable sets. A compact set is not necessarily Jordan measurable. For example, the fat Cantor set is not. Its inner Jordan measure vanishes, since its complement is dense; however, its outer Jordan measure does not vanish, since it cannot be less than (in fact, is equal to) its Lebesgue measure. Also, a bounded open set is not necessarily Jordan measurable. For example, the complement of the fat Cantor set (within the interval) is not. A bounded set is Jordan measurable if and only if its indicator function is Riemann-integrable, and the value of the integral is its Jordan measure.

From this it follows that a bounded set is Jordan measurable if and only if its topological boundary has Lebesgue measure zero. (Or equivalently, if the boundary has Jordan measure zero; the equivalence holds due to compactness of the boundary.)

The Lebesgue measure

This last property greatly limits the types of sets which are Jordan measurable. For example, the set of rational numbers contained in the interval [0,1] is then not Jordan measurable, as its boundary is [0,1] which is not of Jordan measure zero. Intuitively however, the set of rational numbers is a "small" set, as it is countable, and it should have "size" zero. That is indeed true, but only if one replaces the Jordan measure with the Lebesgue measure. The Lebesgue measure of a set is the same as its Jordan measure as long as that set has a Jordan measure. However, the Lebesgue measure is defined for a much wider class of sets, like the set of rational numbers in an interval mentioned earlier, and also for sets which may be unbounded or fractals. Also, the Lebesgue measure, unlike the Jordan measure, is a true measure, that is, any countable union of Lebesgue measurable sets is Lebesgue measurable, whereas countable unions of Jordan measurable sets need not be Jordan measurable.

References

External links

 
 

Measures (measure theory)